Awila Wachana Punta (Quechua awila eagle (from Spanish aguila) or grandmother (from Spanish abuela), wacha birth, to give birth, -na a suffix, awila wachana 'where the eagle is born', also spelled Aguila Huachana Punta) is a mountain in the Bolivian Andes which reaches a height of approximately . It is located in the Cochabamba Department, Quillacollo Province, Quillacollo Municipality. Awila Wachana Punta lies east of Kimsa Tinkuy and a lake named Warawarani.

References 

Mountains of Cochabamba Department